Stephen Turnbull (born March 13, 1998) is an American soccer player who plays for New York City FC II in the MLS Next Pro.

Playing career

Youth
Prior to attending college, Turnbull played for local Long Island club South Huntington Lightning; the club was the top-ranked youth side in the USA in 2015.

College
Turnbull attended Stony Brook University, only a few miles from his hometown, between 2016 and 2021, where he played for the Seawolves. In five years he played 55 matches, scoring one goal.

Senior
On March 24, 2022, Major League Soccer club New York City FC announced a list of players signed for their MLS Next Pro side, NYCFC II, with Turnbull amongst them. His competitive debut came in a loss on penalties to Orlando City B on April 3 while his first goal came in a 7–0 rout of Inter Miami II two weeks later. On March 4, 2023, Turnbull signed a short-term agreement to play with NYCFC's Major League Soccer senior team against Chicago Fire FC.

He made his first MLS roster appearance on September 4, 2022 when he was called up to the senior roster against New England Revolution.

Career statistics
.

References 

1998 births
American soccer players
Association football defenders
Living people
Soccer players from New York (state)
Stony Brook Seawolves men's soccer players
New York City FC II players
MLS Next Pro players
New York City FC players
Major League Soccer players